The Rivals of Sherlock Holmes may refer to:

 The Rivals of Sherlock Holmes (book series), edited by Hugh Greene
 The Rivals of Sherlock Holmes (TV series), broadcast in 1971–73